The Quincy Jets were a former single-A minor league affiliate of the New York Mets from 1962 through 1963.  The Jets played in the Midwest League at Quincy Stadium in Quincy, IL.

References

External links 
 Quincy Jets Web Site

Defunct Midwest League teams
Defunct baseball teams in Illinois
New York Mets minor league affiliates
Professional baseball teams in Illinois
Sports teams in Quincy, Illinois
Baseball teams disestablished in 1963
Baseball teams established in 1960